WSOS (1170 AM) is a radio station which is broadcasting a classic hits format. Licensed to St. Augustine Beach, Florida, United States, the station serves the St. Augustine area.  The station also re-broadcasts on translator W280EY 103.9 FM (St. Augustine).  The station is currently owned by Kevin Geddings through licensee WSOS Radio LLC of St. Augustine, Florida. WSOS AM 1170 is a daytime-only  Class D station, broadcasting on the clear-channel frequency of 1170 kHz. WSOS must leave the air from sunset to sunrise to avoid interference with the nighttime skywave signal of WWVA (AM) in Wheeling, West Virginia.

History
The station went on the air as WAIA on October 15, 1986. During the 1980s, it broadcast an adult contemporary format playing hits from the 1960s, 1970s and 1980s along with its sister-station WSOS-FM. On February 1, 1990, the station changed its call sign to WHWY, then it changed again on September 4, 1992, to WKLN & on February 18, 2003, to the current WSOS.  WSOS was purchased by Kevin Geddings of St. Augustine, Florida in 2012.  He immediately linked it to an FM signal. The station now simulcasts on 103.9 FM (St. Augustine) and 95.7 (Nocatee & Ponte Vedra). Geddings previously owned WFOY/WAOC St. Augustine as well as WXNC and WKMT in Charlotte, North Carolina. Previously Geddings worked for WSPA Spartanburg/Greenville, South Carolina and for RKO Radio in New York City.

Translators

References

1992 Broadcasting Yearbook, page A-79

External links

SOS (AM)
Radio stations established in 1986
1986 establishments in Florida
SOS